ADP-ribosylation factor 5 is a protein that in humans is encoded by the ARF5 gene.

ADP-ribosylation factor 5 (ARF5) is a member of the human ARF gene family. These genes encode small guanine nucleotide-binding proteins that stimulate the ADP-ribosyltransferase activity of cholera toxin and play a role in vesicular trafficking and as activators of phospholipase D.  The gene products include 6 ARF proteins and 11 ARF-like proteins and constitute 1 family of the RAS superfamily. The ARF proteins are categorized as class I (ARF1, ARF2, and ARF3), class II (ARF4 and ARF5) and class III (ARF6). The members of each class share a common gene organization. The ARF5 gene spans approximately 3.2kb of genomic DNA and contains six exons and five introns.

Interactions
ARF5 has been shown to interact with ARFIP2.

References

External links

Further reading